Toulouse-Saint-Agne is a railway station in Toulouse, Occitanie, France. The station is located on the Toulouse–Bayonne and Toulouse–Saint-Agne–Auch railway. The station is served by TER (local) services operated by the SNCF.

Train services
The following services currently call at Toulouse-Saint-Agne:
local service (TER Occitanie) Toulouse–Colomiers–Auch
local service (TER Occitanie) Toulouse–Foix–Latour-de-Carol-Enveitg
local service (TER Occitanie) Toulouse–Saint-Gaudens–Tarbes–Pau

Metro

Toulouse-Saint-Agne also lies on the Toulouse Metro network on line B which operates from Borderouge and Ramonville.

Gallery

References

Railway stations in Haute-Garonne